Alexander is a city in Pulaski and Saline counties in the U.S. state of Arkansas. Located in Central Arkansas, the town was founded as a construction camp for the nearby railroad. Following its completion, the citizens decided to incorporate in 1887. Alexander is home to the Arkansas Juvenile Assessment and Treatment Center. The population was 2,901 at the 2010 census.

Geography
Alexander is located at  (34.631508, -92.444188).

Demographics

2020 census

As of the 2020 United States census, there were 3,385 people, 1,034 households, and 725 families residing in the city.

2000 census
As of the 2000 census, there were 614 people, 276 households, and 171 families in the town.  The population density was 526.8/km (1,369.5/mi²).  There were 305 housing units at an average density of 261.7/km (680.3/mi²).  The racial makeup of the town was 70.68% White, 26.71% Black or African American, 0.49% Native American, 0.98% Asian, 0.33% from other races, and 0.81% from two or more races.  2.28% of the population were Hispanic or Latino of any race.

Of the 276 households 29.3% had children under the age of 18 living with them, 39.1% were married couples living together, 17.4% had a female householder with no husband present, and 38.0% were non-families. 32.6% of households were one person and 6.5% were one person aged 65 or older.  The average household size was 2.22 and the average family size was 2.79.

The age distribution was 24.8% under the age of 18, 8.6% from 18 to 24, 33.1% from 25 to 44, 22.6% from 45 to 64, and 10.9% 65 or older.  The median age was 33 years. For every 100 females, there were 88.3 males.  For every 100 females age 18 and over, there were 75.7 males.

The median household income was $30,050 and the median family income  was $35,341. Males had a median income of $28,571 versus $21,958 for females. The per capita income for the town was $15,157.  About 9.5% of families and 12.8% of the population were below the poverty line, including 9.1% of those under age 18 and 11.0% of those age 65 or over.

Education
The Saline County portion is in the Bryant School District, which operates Bryant High School.

The Pulaski County portion is in the Pulaski County Special School District. It is zoned to Lawson Elementary School, Joe T. Robinson Middle School, and Joe T. Robinson High School.

References

Cities in Pulaski County, Arkansas
Cities in Saline County, Arkansas
Populated places established in 1887
Cities in Arkansas
Populated places in Central Arkansas